The 1896 track cycling world championships were the fourth world championships for track cycling.  They took place in Copenhagen, Denmark.  There were four events: separate amateur and professional races in both the sprint and the stayers' race (motor-paced).

Medal summary

Medal table

External links
Bike Cult Book Track Racing Champions
Mémoire du cyclisme

UCI Track Cycling World Championships by year
1896 in track cycling
International sports competitions in Copenhagen
International cycle races hosted by Denmark
August 1896 sports events
1896 in Copenhagen